Rampage is a series of video games released by Midway (1986–2009) and Warner Bros. Interactive Entertainment (2009–present) for the arcade and various consoles. The basic premise of the games is that, due to experiment-related accidents, the player controls a human transformed into a giant monster. The gameplay revolves around the player using their chosen monster to destroy cities around the world while attacking or avoiding police and military forces.

A film adaptation was released in 2018.

Premise
Humans have been undergoing strange transformations into giant animalistic kaijus due to experiments conducted by the evil and corrupt Scumlabs. These monsters proceed to travel through the United States, around the globe, into space and eventually through time itself destroying (and occasionally devouring) everything in sight. Heavy inspiration is drawn from various monster movies such as King Kong and 20 Million Miles to Earth. George was turned into a giant ape, Lizzie was turned into a giant dinosaur, and Ralph was turned into a giant werewolf.

Games
 Rampage (1986) - The experiments of Scumlabs causes George, Lizzie, and Ralph to mutate into giant monsters who go on a rampage in the city while avoiding the military.
 Rampage World Tour (1997) - An explosion at Scumlabs releases George, Lizzie, and Ralph who begin to destroy all of Scumlabs' locations throughout the world.
 Rampage 2: Universal Tour (1999) - Another accident releases three new monsters like a rhinoceros-like monster named Boris, a mouse monster named Curtis, and a lobster monster named Ruby who go on a rampage and free George, Lizzie, and Ralph from their confinement as an alien invasion occurs.
 Rampage Through Time (2000) - As Scumlabs uses a time machine to clean up the mess in the past, George, Lizzie, Ralph, Boris, Curtis, and Ruby return to Earth with a common warthog monster named Harley where they use the time machine to cause havoc on Earth in the past, present, and future.
 Rampage Puzzle Attack (2001) - 
 Rampage: Total Destruction (2006) - Scumlabs has developed a new soda which turns 30 (40 in the Wii version) people into monsters. While most of them have been placed in cryo-tubes, some have escaped and go on a rampage around the world while freeing those in the cryo-tubes.
 Rampage (2018) - Adapted from the film, serves as a reboot to the series.

Film adaptation

A live-action film adaptation was released on April 13, 2018, directed by Brad Peyton and starring Dwayne Johnson. The film features the classic trio of George, Lizzie and Ralph, this time as mutated animals rather than transformed humans.

To tie into the film four separate video games were created. One is an arcade game created exclusively for Dave & Buster's who co-created the game alongside Adrenaline Amusements for their restaurant chain, another is an app called RAMPAGE: AR Unleashed, while the third is a free-to-play browser game called Rampage City Smash. The fourth is a virtual reality game called Project Rampage VR.

References

Kaiju video games
 
Video games adapted into films
Video game franchises
Video game franchises introduced in 1986
Video games featuring female protagonists
Warner Bros. Games franchises